Cannabis in Yemen is illegal. Cannabis is less common in Yemen than khat.

History
Cannabis is listed as one of the agricultural products of Yemen during the Rasulid dynasty (1229-1454).

Economy
Yemen is Saudi Arabia's principal source of drugs.

In 2007, Yemen was the fifteenth-most prolific producer of cannabis resin, comprising 0.4% of seized cannabis globally.

References

Yemen
Drugs in Yemen